Amy Scurria (born September 24, 1973) is an American composer.

Biography
Amy Scurria was born into a military family and showed an early interest in music, memorizing the piano assignments of her sister Jackie. At age 11 she took lessons under the Suzuki method and began composing. Scurria graduated from Rice University in Houston, Texas, in 1995 with a bachelor's degree in composition. In 1998 she received a master's degree in composition from Johns Hopkins University. She completed her doctoral degree in 2015 from Duke University in Durham. Dr. Scurria has also studied at La Schola Cantorum in Paris, France.

Teachers she studied with include: Chen Yi, Robert Sirota, Narcis Bonet, Anthony Kelley, and Stephen Jaffe. Her compositions have been performed in the United States, England, Brazil, Spain, Portugal, France, and Japan. She was a composer-in-residence at Shepherd College in Shepherdstown, West Virginia, in 2001.

Personal life
In 2004, Amy Scurria married Zane Corriher.  They have a daughter, Lily, who is also a composer.

Honors and awards
 Duke University Evan Frankel Fellowship Recipient
 Duke University Aleane Webb Dissertation Research Award
 Duke University Summer Research Fellowship Recipient
 1991 Northern Virginia Composition Competition
 1998 Haddonfeld Young Composers' Competition
 ASCAP Award Recipient, 1999–present
 Winner of Haddonfield Young Composers Competition for Beyond All Walking, 1998
 Music highlighted at National Convention for Women in the Arts, Rice University, 1996
 Winner of N. VA Composition Competition, 1990
 Superior rating in National and State Piano Guild, 1988–91

Works
Selected works include:
 Beyond All Walking for Full Orchestra, (1998)
 A Prayer for SATB Choir, (1999)
 And He Shall Be Like a Tree for SATB Choir and Organ/Piano, (2000)
 We Are Met at Gettysburg for full orchestra (2003) with Steve Heitzeg
 Adaptations (2007)
 La Loba (2008)
 Tiamat (2008)
 Something Borrowed, Something Blue (2008)
 What the Soul Remembers (2009)
 Esperanza Rising (2009)
 Pearl: An Opera in Two Acts (2015)

References

External links
Amy Scurria's page at Theodore Presser Company
Amy Scurria's Wilson's Aria 2 from YouTube

1973 births
Living people
20th-century classical composers
American women classical composers
American classical composers
American music educators
American women music educators
Rice University alumni
Johns Hopkins University alumni
Duke University alumni
20th-century American women musicians
20th-century American composers
21st-century American women musicians
20th-century women composers
21st-century American composers
21st-century classical composers
21st-century women composers
Shepherd University faculty